O Houria (اوه حرية "Oh Liberty") is the 2010 fourth album of Souad Massi.

Track listing 
Samira Meskina
All Remains To Be Done -duet  with Francis Cabrel 
Kin Kohun Alik Ebaida
Ô Houria (Liberty)
Nacera
A Letter To... Si H'med
Everything I Love
Khabar Kana
Enta Ouzahrek
Stop Pissing Me Off
A Smile
Let Me Be In Peace , feat. Paul Weller

References

Souad Massi albums
2010 albums